Rock Hard Power Spray is a Danish rock band from Odense, that was founded in 2004 and consists of Frederik Valentin, Mattias Hundebøll, Ask Fogh, and Simon Andersen. They have made three albums, the first Commercial Suicide in 2006, their second album Trigger Nation in April 2008, and third: "Rock Hard Power Spray: If You Think Our Last Two Records Sucked You're Gonna Love This One" In 15.11.2010

In 2005, the band won the world's biggest music competition, Emergenza festival, in Germany, earning them a fully paid promotional tour in the United States, with Green Day. In 2006, the band went on a  European tour with The Bloodhound Gang, playing 23 concerts in 25 days.

Lineup
Matt - Vocals, guitar (2004 -)
Fred - Guitar, Vocals (2004 -)
Ask Fxxx - Bass (2004 -)
Simon - Drums (2004 -)

Discography

Albums
Commercial Suicide (2006)
Trigger Nation (2008)
If You Think Our Last Two Records Sucked You're Gonna Love This One! (2010)

DVDs
Rock'n'Fuck

External links

Official website
Official My Space Site
http://www.bloghardpowerspray.com

Danish hard rock musical groups
Danish heavy metal musical groups
Musical groups established in 2004